3-Hydroxybenzoic acid is a monohydroxybenzoic acid.

Preparation
3-Hydroxybenzoic acid can be obtained by the alkali fusion of 3-sulfobenzoic acid between 210 – 220°C.

Natural occurrence 
3-Hydroxybenzoic acid is a component of castoreum, the exudate from the castor sacs of the mature North American beaver (Castor canadensis) and the European beaver (Castor fiber), used in perfumery.

It can also be formed by a Pseudomonas species from 3-Chlorobenzoic acid.

3-Hydroxybenzoic Acid can be found in the pineapple fruit as well.

References 

Monohydroxybenzoic acids